Hangzhou Internet Court is a court of special jurisdiction in China.

The court was established on August 18, 2017, based on Hangzhou Railway Transport Court. It hears Internet-related cases like contract disputes involving online shopping, services and copyright infringement.

On August 16, 2017, the fourth meeting of the Standing Committee of the 13th People's Congress of Hangzhou appointed the President, Vice President and Judges of the Hangzhou Internet Court. On August 18, 2017, the Hangzhou Internet Court was officially inaugurated, with the sign hanging on the Hangzhou Railway Transportation Court.

See also 

 Judicial system of China

References

External links 

Judiciary of China
2017 establishments in China
Internet law
Internet in China
Courts and tribunals established in 2017